The women's high jump event at the 2006 Commonwealth Games was held on March 23.

Results

References
Results

High
2006
2006 in women's athletics